Helena Pedersdotter Strange (Danish: Helene; in Sweden also called Queen Elin; c. 1200–1255) of a Danish noble family later called Ulfeldt was a Queen of Sweden as the wife of King Canute II.

Her father was the Danish knight Peder Strangesson and her mother was Ingeborg Esbernsdatter, of the noble Hvide clan, a niece of Danish Archbishop Absalon. She is believed to have married the Swedish regent Canute in about 1225, though the exact year is not known. From 1222 he was the regent for the child monarch, King Eric XI of Sweden, and took the throne himself in 1229, thereby making Helena, or Elin as she was often called in Sweden, Queen. She used the same seal as her husband on official documents, a curious fact which indicates that she may have exerted some political influence.

In 1234, her husband died, and the deposed King Eric returned. Queen Dowager Elin remarried the nobleman Filip Lauresson. In 1247, she witnessed her son from her first marriage rebel against the new monarch; he failed, and was executed in 1248. Her second son was executed in 1251, and the same year, she became a widow. She died about 1255.

Children 
Holmger Knutsson, d. 1248, executed in a rebellion after the Battle of Sparrsätra of 1247.
Filip Knutsson, executed in 1251.

Further reading
 Åke Ohlmarks: Alla Sveriges drottningar (All the queens of Sweden) (Swedish)

1200 births
1255 deaths
Helen 1229
House of Eric
13th-century Danish people
13th-century Swedish people
13th-century Danish women
13th-century Swedish women